Lokobe National Park is a national park in northwestern Madagascar. It is located on southeastern side of Nosy Be, an island off the coast of Madagascar. It is known for its black lemurs and the beautiful Nosy Be panther chameleon.

References

National parks of Madagascar
Protected areas established in 1927
1927 establishments in Madagascar
Madagascar subhumid forests